Route 205 is a collector road in the Canadian province of Nova Scotia.

It is located in Victoria County on Cape Breton Island and runs between Baddeck and MacAulays Hill connecting at both ends with Highway 105. It was originally known as Trunk 5 until 1970.

Communities
Baddeck
Crescent Cove
Baddeck Bay
MacAulays Hill

See also
List of Nova Scotia provincial highways

References

Nova Scotia provincial highways
Roads in Victoria County, Nova Scotia